The chiseltooth wrasse (Pseudodax moluccanus) is a species of marine ray-finned fish, a wrasse from the family Labridae. It is native to the Indian Ocean and the western Pacific Ocean. It is of minor importance to local commercial fisheries and can be found in the aquarium trade. P. moluccanus is the only known member of its genus.

Description
The chiseltooth wrasse is greyish to reddish-brown in background colour and there is a dark streak or spot on each scake on their body. They have a yellow upper lip which has a blue streak above it and they have, blue teeth. The caudal fin is black with a blue margin. The juveniles are pale blue with a wide stripe along the flanks while the subadult fish show a yellow band at the base of the tail. The juveniles of this species bear a strong resemblance to the cleaner wrasses of the genus Labroides and they also behave as cleaner fish. It has 11 spines and 12 rays in the dorsal fin while the anal fin has 3 spines and 14 soft rays. The maximum size reached is  total length.

Distribution
The chisel tooth wrasse has a wide Indo-Pacific distribution from the western Indian Ocean from the Red Sea south to South Africa and eastwards to the Tuamotus, north to Japan and south to Lord Howe Island, Australia.

Habitat and biology
The adult fish occur in the vicinity of cabes while the juveniles often live within them. The adults are solitary and have a diet of algae and small invertebrates. The juveniles have been recorded behaving as cleaner fish. This species is regarded as being closely related to the parrotfishes of the family Scaridae because of the pattern of teeth in its mouth but in behaviour is more like a species in the genus Anampses.

References

External links
 

Fish of Thailand
Labridae
Monotypic fish genera
Fish described in 1840